Johann Sebastian Bach composed the church cantata  (Make yourself ready, my spirit), 115, in Leipzig for the 22nd Sunday after Trinity and first performed it on 5 November 1724. The chorale cantata is based on the hymn by Johann Burchard Freystein (1695).

History and words 
Bach composed the cantata in his second year in Leipzig for the 22nd Sunday after Trinity. That year, Bach composed a cycle of chorale cantatas, begun on the first Sunday after Trinity of 1724. The prescribed readings for the Sunday were from the Epistle to the Philippians, thanks and prayer for the congregation in Philippi, and from the Gospel of Matthew, the parable of the unforgiving servant.

The cantata is based on a hymn in ten stanzas by Johann Burchard Freystein (1695), which expands a single theme related to the Gospel: be prepared by awareness and prayer for the arrival of the Lord. An unknown poet retained the first and the last stanza as movements 1 and 6 of the cantata. He derived the inner movements as a sequence of alternating arias and recitatives from the inner stanzas, using stanza 2 for 2, stanzas 3 to 6 for 3, stanza 7 for 4, keeping the first two lines unchanged, and stanzas 8 to 9 for 5. The chorale is sung to the anonymous melody of "" (1681).

Bach first performed the cantata on 5 November 1724.

Scoring and structure 
The cantata in six movements is scored for four vocal soloists (soprano, alto, tenor and bass), a four-part choir, horn to double the soprano in the chorale, flauto traverso, oboe d'amore, two violins, viola, violoncello piccolo and basso continuo.

 Chorale: 
 Aria (alto): 
 Recitative (bass): 
 Aria (soprano): 
 Recitative (tenor): 
 Chorale:

Music 
The opening chorus is a chorale fantasia in the form of a passacaglia. The instruments perform independent concertante chamber music, set for three parts, the flute, the oboe d'amore and the strings in unison. The soprano sings the melody as a cantus firmus, the lower voices are set partly in imitation, partly homophonic. The alto aria (Oh, sleepy soul – are you still at rest?) begins, as Klaus Hofmann notes, "as a musical sleep scene of a kind that could have graced any opera of the time". Marked Adagio, the oboe d'amore plays a solo in siciliano rhythm, leading to a "long, peaceful, quasi-'sleeping' note". The text's admonition to be vigilant ("Punishment might suddenly awaken you and, if you were not alert, conceal you in the sleep of eternal death") appears in the contrasting middle section, marked Allegro.

In the soprano aria "" (But you should also pray), flute and violoncello piccolo play chamber music, to which the solo adds a "noble cantilena". The closing chorale is a four-part setting of the final call: "Therefore let us forever be alert, entreat and pray".

Recordings 
 Bach Cantatas Vol. 5 – Sundays after Trinity II, Karl Richter, Münchener Bach-Chor, Münchener Bach-Orchester, Edith Mathis, Trudeliese Schmidt, Ernst Haefliger, Peter Schreier, Dietrich Fischer-Dieskau, Archiv Produktion 1978
 J. S. Bach: Das Kantatenwerk · Complete Cantatas · Les Cantates, Folge / Vol. 29 – BWV 115-117, 119, Nikolaus Harnoncourt, Tölzer Knabenchor, Concentus Musicus Wien, soloist of the Tölzer Knabenchor, Paul Esswood, Kurt Equiluz, Philippe Huttenlocher, Teldec 1979
 Die Bach Kantate Vol. 57, Helmuth Rilling, Gächinger Kantorei, Bach-Collegium Stuttgart, Arleen Augér, Helen Watts, Lutz-Michael Harder, Wolfgang Schöne, Hänssler 1980
 J. S. Bach: Cantatas with Violoncelle Piccolo, Christophe Coin, Das Leipziger Concerto Vocale, Ensemble Baroque de Limoges, Barbara Schlick, Andreas Scholl, Christoph Prégardien, Gotthold Schwarz, Auvidis Astrée 1993
 J. S. Bach: Complete Cantatas Vol. 11, Ton Koopman, Amsterdam Baroque Orchestra & Choir, Lisa Larsson, Annette Markert, Christoph Prégardien, Klaus Mertens, Antoine Marchand 1999
 Bach Edition Vol. 11 – Cantatas Vol. 5, Pieter Jan Leusink, Holland Boys Choir, Netherlands Bach Collegium, Marjon Strijk, Sytse Buwalda, Nico van der Meel, Bas Ramselaar, Brilliant Classics 1999
 Bach Cantatas Vol. 12: Tooting/Winchester / For the 22nd Sunday after Trinity, John Eliot Gardiner, Monteverdi Choir, English Baroque Soloists, Joanne Lunn, Robin Tyson, James Gilchrist, Peter Harvey, Soli Deo Gloria 2000
 J. S. Bach: Cantatas Vol. 27 – Cantatas from Leipzig 1724 – BWV 5, 80, 115, Masaaki Suzuki, Bach Collegium Japan, Susanne Rydén, Pascal Bertin, Gerd Türk, Peter Kooy, BIS 2003

References

Sources 

 Mache dich, mein Geist, bereit BWV 115; BC A 156 / Chorale cantata (22nd Sunday after Trinity) Bach Digital
 Cantata BWV 115 Mache dich, mein Geist, bereit history, scoring, sources for text and music, translations to various languages, discography, discussion, Bach Cantatas Website
 BWV 115 Mache dich, mein Geist, bereit English translation, University of Vermont
 BWV 115 Mache dich, mein Geist, bereit text, scoring, University of Alberta
 Chapter 23 BWV 115 Mache dich, mein Geist, bereit / Come, prepare yourself, my soul. Julian Mincham, 2010
 Luke Dahn: BWV 115.6 bach-chorales.com

Church cantatas by Johann Sebastian Bach
1724 compositions